The United States Permanent Representative to the International Civil Aviation Organization is the leader of the U.S. Mission to the International Civil Aviation Organization (ICAO). The position is formally known as the permanent representative of the United States of America, with the rank and status of ambassador extraordinary and plenipotentiary. The position is but one of the United States' representatives to the United Nations and its other constituent agencies. The U.S. nominee to the Air Navigation Commission, a body that works towards the uniformity in regulations, standards and procedures which will facilitate and improve air navigation to international standards, acts as the deputy to the Permanent Representative.

The United States sent a delegation to the 1944 Chicago Conference, and became a party of the Convention on International Civil Aviation which was resolved at its end on 7 December 1944. The United States first sent a permanent representative to serve on the Council of the Provisional International Civil Aviation Organization (PICAO) which began operating on 6 June 1945 and was replaced by ICAO on 7 April 1947. Air Force General Laurence S. Kuter was appointed the first representative to ICAO by presidential order in September 1946, and fully appointed in September 1947.

List of representatives
Status

The following is a chronological list of those who have held the office:

Notes

External links

 
ICAO
United States and the United Nations
United States diplomacy